Hills et al. v. Ross II, 3 U.S. (3 Dall.) 331 (1796), is an early United States Supreme Court case.

See also
 List of United States Supreme Court cases, volume 3
 Hills et al. v. Ross

References

External links
 

United States Supreme Court cases
1796 in United States case law
United States Supreme Court cases of the Ellsworth Court